Our Revolution: A Future to Believe In is a book by U.S. Senator from Vermont Bernie Sanders, published by Thomas Dunne Books in November 2016.

It was released on November 15, 2016, a week after the election of Donald Trump. The book was written in the context of Sanders's 2016 presidential campaign and aimed to explain some of its rationale.

Contents
In the book, Sanders sets out his position on climate change, free college tuition, income inequality, closing the gender wage gap and defeating Donald Trump while campaigning for Hillary Clinton during the last three months leading to the 2016 presidential election.

Sanders discusses how his presidential campaign was considered by the political establishment and the media to be a "fringe" campaign and something not to be taken seriously. He discusses his initial struggle as being an "Independent senator from a small state with little name recognition".

Reception
Upon its release, it was on The New York Times Best Seller List at number 3.

John R. Coyne Jr. gave the memoir a positive review for The Washington Times saying that "For starters, it tells us who this man who energized so many young people really is—an enthusiastic young socialist trapped in an old curmudgeon's body, his ideas basically just as fresh to him today as when he left his native Brooklyn".

David Weigel of The Denver Post said that the memoir was "like a sitcom character who gets beaned on the head and hallucinates an angel—or a talking dog, or a 75-year-old senator from Vermont—spinning lessons about what really matters in life".

Sanders and Mark Ruffalo were nominated for the Grammy Award for Best Spoken Word Album.

See also 
 Stronger Together, Hillary Clinton's 2016 campaign book
 Crippled America, Donald Trump's 2016 campaign book published in 2015
 Our Revolution, a PAC set up to support Sanders's policies and campaign for progressive candidates

References

2016 non-fiction books
American political books
Books about the 2016 United States presidential election
Books by Bernie Sanders
English-language books
Thomas Dunne Books books
St. Martin's Press books